Aaron Rasmussen is an American CEO and game designer. He is a co-founder of MasterClass, an online education platform, USMechatronics and Harcos Laboratories and the founder of Outlier.org, a college level education platform that offers online college courses. In 2012, he and co-creator Michael T. Astolfi created and crowdfunded BlindSide, a survival/horror adventure game, which was a finalist at IndieCade 2012. In 2005, while a student at Boston University, he invented a robotic sentry gun.

Early life
During a chemistry class in high school, Rasmussen was involved in a chemical explosion from a combination of red phosphorus and potassium chlorate, which resulted in his being temporarily blind; this temporary blindness later inspired the creation of BlindSide.

Career
Rasmussen co-founded the online education platform MasterClass with David Rogier in 2012, and was responsible for its style and production processes.

In 2018, Rasmussen founded Outlier.org, a university-level education platform that allows students to take online classes for college credit that are accredited by the University of Pittsburgh.

References

Year of birth missing (living people)
Living people
21st-century American inventors
American video game designers
Boston University alumni
American businesspeople